Luhačovice is a spa town in Zlín District in the Zlín Region of the Czech Republic. It has about 5,000 inhabitants. It is known for the largest spa in Moravia. The town centre with the spa infrastructure is well preserved and is protected by law as an urban monument zone.

Administrative parts
Villages of Kladná Žilín, Polichno and Řetechov are administrative parts of Luhačovice. Polichno and Řetechov form two exclaves of the municipal territory.

Etymology
The name was probably derived from an old personal name Luhač. The name could also be derived from luhy, which means meadows on wetter soil.

Geography

The town occupies the valley of the Luhačovický stream with an elevation of about 250 m above sea level, surrounded by a hilly landscape. The entire municipal territory lies in the Vizovice Highlands, however, the eastern part of the territory extends into the White Carpathians Protected Landscape Region.

History

The first written mention of Luhačovice is from 1412. At the end of the 16th century Luhačovice became the centre of a manor including 12 villages. After the Battle of White Mountain, the manor was acquired by Maximilian of Liechtenstein. He sold the manor soon and from 1629 until 1945 the manor belonged to the Serényi family.

The Serényis were the first to make use of the mineral springs in the area and who built the spa. In the second half of the 17th century, Count Ondřej Serényi had adjusted the first spring, later named Amandka after another member of the family, Amand Serényi. Another spring was adjusted in around 1760 and later renamed Vincentka after Vincent Serényi. Reports of the healing power of Luhačovice springs spread, and the first inn for spa guests was built in 1789. In the late 18th century, new houses, inns and Chapel of Saint Elizabeth were built in the vicinity of the springs.

In the late 19th century, stagnation and impending bankruptcy affected the spa. In 1902, a Czech physician František Veselý came to Luhačovice and decided to get financial means to change Luhačovice into a modern Czech spa by establishing a joint-stock company, which took over the spa from the control of the Serényis. They, however, kept on taking a significant part in it financially. The railway line was built, which became necessary for the municipality, and Luhačovice gained direct transport connections from Prague, Brno and Olomouc. The first stage of important building development of the spa area was connected with the name of the architect Dušan Jurkovič, the author of the fundamental reconstruction of the Janův House, the hydropathic establishment and other places.

After the stagnation during the World War I and setting-up of the independent Czechoslovak Republic, mainly in the 20s and 30s, the importance of the Luhačovice spa increased along with the increasing number of inhabitants. The municipality of Luhačovice was promoted to a town in 1936. Further buildings of architectural importance appeared. After the occupation of Bohemia and Moravia by Nazi Germany, the spa was closed to the Czech public almost completely and was taken possession of by the Nazi organizations.

Between 1945 and 1947, a new complex of spa buildings was built: the Great Colonnade and Small Colonnade, the Hall of Vincentka, and the health centre. Social changes after February 1948 influenced both the life of the people in Luhačovice and the spa organization as a whole, after the entire spa infrastructure was nationalized. In 1957 Luhačovice and other spas were given the spa statute, and the spa care was unified in the Ministry of Health. Both the spa care and environment are always in the course of improvement.

In 2017, the Luhačovice Castle and several other properties were given back to Isabella Thienen-Adlerflycht, née Serényi through restitution.

Demographics

Mineral water

Luhačovice mineral water is a heavily mineralized, naturally effervescent residual seawater, indicated for diseases of vocal cords and breathing pathways, metabolic diseases, stomach and duodenal ulcers, liver cirrhosis, diabetes mellitus, chronic pancreatitis, and excessive consumption of alcohol. The water is bottled under the brand name Vincentka.

There are three wells of Vincentka in Luhačovice. The original one is available to the public in Hall of Vincentka, it is however too low-yield (10–12 liters per minute) to be used for bottling. The second well, Nová Vincentka, was made in 1988. The third well, Vincentka 2, with a yield of 40 litres per minute, is a reserve well for spa medicinal use.

Sights

The small Chapel of Saint Elizabeth from 1795 is the oldest preserved building in Luhačovice. From the 1880s, many villas were built in the town, mostly in the Swiss Style Art Nouveau and Neorenaissance styles.

In 1902–1914, the architect Dušan Jurkovič created here a unique set of buildings in the style of folk Art Nouveau inspired by local natural environment. The appearance of his buildings influenced the entire urbanism of Luhačovice. The Jurkovič House from 1902 was his first building which belongs to the most famous and valuable objects in the spa. The hotel is decorated by fresco of Saints Cyril and Methodius by Jano Köhler. Other Jurkovič's folk Art Nouveau buildings include Chaloupka and Jestřabí hotels, a hydrotherapy institute with the Sunshine Spa swimming pool, Vlastimila and Valaška villas, a bandstand, and several building that have not been preserved.

In the 1920s and 1930s, spa houses and pavilions, the town hall, a new swimming pool and a community house were built with the contribution of architects such as Bohuslav Fuchs, J. L. Holzl or Kuba brothers, and completed the unique appearance of the town.

Notable people
Tomáš Eduard Šilinger (1866–1913), politician and journalist; died here
Bronislav Červenka (born 1975), footballer

Twin towns – sister cities

Luhačovice is twinned with:
 Piešťany, Slovakia
 Topoľčany, Slovakia
 Ustroń, Poland

References

External links

 
Tourist portal
Infoserver of Luhačovice and surroundings

Cities and towns in the Czech Republic
Spa towns in the Czech Republic
Populated places in Zlín District